Cecil Alonzo Cushman (December 15, 1890 – November 3, 1959) was an American football, basketball and baseball coach. He served as the head football coach at East Texas State Normal School—now known as Texas A&M University–Commerce—in 1920, Simpson College in Indianola, Iowa from 1921 to 1922, and the University of Redlands in Redlands, California from 1923 to 1925 and against from 1933 to 1952, compiling career college football coaching record of 90–99–15.  Cushman was the head basketball coach at East Texas State in 1920–21, Simpson from 1921 to 1923, and Redlands from 1923 to 1926, amassing a career college basketball mark of 39–46. He was recognized as the inventor of the "kicking toe," a special shoe designed to aid "straight-toe" style placekickers in football.  Cushman played attended Texas A&M University and was a member of the 1912 Texas A&M Aggies football team.

Head coaching record

Football

References

External links
 

1890 births
1959 deaths
American football centers
Basketball coaches from Texas
Redlands Bulldogs football coaches
Redlands Bulldogs men's basketball coaches
Simpson Storm baseball coaches
Simpson Storm football coaches
Simpson Storm men's basketball coaches
Texas A&M Aggies football players
Texas A&M–Commerce Lions football coaches
Texas A&M–Commerce Lions men's basketball coaches
Pittsburg State University alumni
People from Greenville, Texas
People from Sherman, Texas
Players of American football from Texas